Rhynchophorus, or common name palm weevils, is a genus of beetles in the weevil family, Curculionidae. Palm weevils are major pests of various trees in the family  Arecaceae throughout the tropics including: coconut (Cocos nucifera), Areca catechu, species of the genus Phoenix, and Metroxylon sagu. Two species are invasive pests outside their native ranges, Rhynchophorus ferrugineus and Rhynchophorus palmarum.

Species

References

External links
 Biolib

Dryophthorinae
Agricultural pest insects